Miles Ahead may refer to:

 Miles Ahead (album), 1957 album by Miles Davis
 Miles Ahead (film), 2015 film about Miles Davis
 Miles Ahead (soundtrack), soundtrack to the film